Hawal is a notified area of district Srinagar, the summer capital of  union territory of Jammu and Kashmir, India.

Known for
Hawal is known for Hari Parbat, Islamia College of Science and Commerce, Srinagar, among other places. It also took place for the 1990 Hawal massacre when the Indian Paramilitary forces fired on an unarmed funeral procession carrying the body of Mirwaiz Moulvi Farooq, a religious leader with machine guns from a camp near the Islamia College killing over 60 and injuring more than 200.
hawal has completely changed from the past decade, it has become the business hub.

References

Villages in Srinagar district